The vice premiers of the State Council of the People's Republic of China are high-ranking officials under the premier and above the state councillors and ministers. Generally, the title is held by multiple individuals at any given time, with each vice-premier holding a broad portfolio of responsibilities. The first vice-premier takes over duties of the premier at the time of the latter's incapacity. The incumbent vice premiers, in order of rank, are Ding Xuexiang, He Lifeng, Zhang Guoqing and Liu Guozhong.

The highest-ranked office holder is informally called the Senior Vice Premier or First Vice Premier or Executive Vice Premier, a most prominent case being Deng Xiaoping in the mid-to-late 1970s. In irregular instances, the position of a senior vice premier has been named either to indicate degree of power, nominal power, or when the premier is incapacitated and requires a full-time deputy to carry out his regular duties.

Current vice-premiers

References

See also 

 State Council of the People's Republic of China
 Premier of the People's Republic of China
 List of vice premiers of the People's Republic of China
 State Councilor
 Secretary-General of the State Council
 Political position ranking of the People's Republic of China

 
Premier of the People's Republic of China